The Sky Skidder is a 1929 American action film directed by Bruce M. Mitchell and written by Carl Krusada and Gardner Bradford. The film stars Al Wilson, Helen Foster, Wilbur McGaugh and Gilbert Holmes. The film was released on January 13, 1929, by Universal Pictures.

Like many actors in the silent film era, Wilson did not survive the transition to "talkies", with The Sky Skidder, his penultimate film.

Plot
Inventor Al Simpkins (Al Wilson) develops a new aviation fuel, he calls  "Economo". Simpkins claims the fuel can gets a "1,000 miles to the pint." During a test, flight, he sees his sweetheart, Stella Hearns (Helen Foster) in an automobile with the wealthy and dishonest Silas Smythe (Wilbur McGaugh). When Smythe's automobile goes out of control, however, Al rescues Stella using a rope ladder.

Just before the "Economo" demonstration flight, Smythe steals the formula for the secret fuel and refills Al's tank with gasoline, causing a crash. Stella then finances the next venture, a huge monoplane flying with a full tank of Economo.

During a race, Smythe uses Economo in his aircraft. After Al discovers his formula is missing, with Stella on board the monoplane, he chases Smythe. When he catches the thief, Al drops down onto his aircraft using on a rope ladder,  and retrieves his formula. He returns to his aircraft, wins the race and, naturally, Stella.

Cast
         
 Al Wilson as Al Simpkins
 Helen Foster as Stella Hearns
 Wilbur McGaugh as Silas Smythe
 Gilbert Holmes as Bert Beatle (credited as "Pee Wee Holmes")

Production
Al Wilson was not only the star of The Sky Skidder but also flew as a "stunt pilot" in the film. After becoming a flying instructor and a short period as manager of the Mercury Aviation Company, founded by one of his students, Cecil B. DeMille, Wilson became more and more skilled in performing stunts, including wing-walking, and left the company to become a professional stunt pilot, specializing in Hollywood aviation films.

Wilson worked together with stuntmen like Frank Clarke and Wally Timm and also for film companies, including Universal Pictures. After numerous appearances in stunt roles, he started his career as an actor in 1923 with the serial The Eagle's Talons. Wilson produced his own movies until 1927, when he went back to work with Universal.

Reception
Aviation film historian Stephen Pendo, in Aviation in the Cinema (1985) said The Sky Skidder was only one of a long list of aviation films that showcased Wilson's talents. He alternately wrote, acted and flew in a career that "spanned more than 10 years, and he acted in more films than any other professional pilot." In The Sky Skidder , Pendo noted, "The aerial stunts featured a parachute jump, a faked plane change, and the pick-up of the heroine from a car by the hero on a ladder hanging from a plane."

References

Notes

Citations

Bibliography

 Pendo, Stephen. Aviation in the Cinema. Lanham, Maryland: Scarecrow Press, 1985. .
 Wynne, H. Hugh. The Motion Picture Stunt Pilots and Hollywood's Classic Aviation Movies. Missoula, Montana: Pictorial Histories Publishing Co., 1987. .

External links
 
 

1929 films
American action films
American aviation films
1920s action films
Universal Pictures films
Films directed by Bruce M. Mitchell
American silent feature films
American black-and-white films
1920s English-language films
1920s American films